Niépce Glacier is a glacier which joins with Daguerre Glacier and flows into Lauzanne Cove, Flandres Bay, on the north coast of Kyiv Peninsula, Graham Land. Shown on an Argentine government chart of 1954. Named by the United Kingdom Antarctic Place-Names Committee (UK-APC) in 1960 for Joseph N. Niepce (1765–1833), French physicist, the first man to produce a permanent photographic record, 1816–29, who, with J.L.M. Daguerre, invented the daguerreotype process of photography perfected in 1839.

Glaciers of Danco Coast